Oriental Dragon Football Club is a Portuguese association football club based in Moita, Portugal that plays in the Portuguese Campeonato de Portugal. The club was founded in 2014 with the goal of training Chinese players under Portuguese coaching.

History
In 2014, the club was founded by WSports Seven led by investor Qi Chen, who had been working with Portuguese clubs since 2006 and had arranged the transfers of Chinese players Yu Dabao and Wang Gang to top Portuguese club S.L. Benfica in 2006 and 2007. The club was created to include Chinese players under Portuguese coaching, with the goal of them eventually returning to China and improving the quality of that country's league and national team. The club are members of the Setúbal Football Association. The club initially was composed exclusively of Chinese footballers between 15 and 19 years in 2014, after creating their own U21 youth league called the Future Stars league as some of the players were too young to play in the official leagues due to being under 18 and included clubs from the Lisbon and Setúbal football associations which they funded and required each team to field at least one Chinese player. Due to Chen's connection with Benfica, he was able to have many former Benfica B coaches join the club. They also initially began as a second team to C.D. Pinhalnovense. 

The club officially began play in the Portuguese football league system during the 2015-16 season in the fifth-tier Setúbal FA Second Division, finishing eighth with nine Chinese players on the roster. In the 2017-18 season, they finished second in the division earning promotion to the Setúbal FA First Division. In 2018-19, they were the finalists in the AF Setúbal Cup. In 2019-20, they won the Setúbal FA First Division, at the time of its cancellation due to the COVID-19 pandemic, 11 points ahead of the second-place club F.C. Barreirense, earning promotion to the third-tier Campeonato de Portugal at the national level. In 2021-22, they moved up to the newly created third-tier Liga 3. However, after finishing in last in both their division and the relegation series, they were relegated back to the Campeonato de Portugal (now the fourth tier).

Year-by-Year

References

Association football clubs established in 2014
Football clubs in Portugal
2014 establishments in Portugal
Sport in Moita